Parnassius clodius is a white butterfly which is found in the United States and Canada. It is a member of the snow Apollo genus (Parnassius) of the swallowtail family (Papilionidae).

Description

Note: The wing pattern in Parnassius species is inconsistent and the very many subspecies and forms make identification problematic and uncertain. Structural characters derived from the genitalia, wing venation, sphragis and foretibial epiphysis are more, but not entirely reliable. The description given here is a guide only. For an identification key see Ackery P.R. (1975).

Ground-colour white, only in the female the short costal band placed outside the cell connected with the hindmarginal spot by an irregular dusty band, the glossy submarginal band of the forewing sharp but narrow, the male with small, the female with larger, crescent-shaped submarginal spots on the hindwing; on the latter the anal spot mostly centred with red.

Distribution
It is in western North America in British Columbia, Washington, Oregon, Nevada and California.

Subspecies
 P. c. altaurus Dyar, 1903 Idaho and Wyoming - Has yellowish instead of red anal spots. 
 P. c. shepardi Eisner, 1966 Shepard's parnassian. Wawawai, Snake River Canyon, Washington
 P. c. baldur Edwards, 1877  - Distinguished by reduced and less sharp markings. In the male the hindmarginal spot is mostly absent on the forewing and the anal spot on the hindwing; the posterior ocellus is reduced as a rule; the female has no submarginal crescents on the hindwing, the anal spot is rarely centred with red; in both sexes the white dusting very thin, somewhat transparent. Occurs in the mountains to the east of the district of the principal form. Varies rather considerably, and forms on the one hand transitions to the coast form, on the other hand there occurs a further reduction of the pattern. Specimens with point-like, reduced posterior ocellus are not rare. These are ab. lusca Stichel. On the other hand, ab. lorquini Oherth., in which the ocelli are entirely absent, occurs sparingly. In the type of this form in addition all the black markings also are effaced except two narrow oblong spots in the middle and at the end of the cell of the forewing and some blackish dusting at the hindmargin of the hindwing. A further race from Montana, gallatinus Stich., is distinguished by the band-pattern of the male being in general weakly marked, while on the contrary there is a complete discal band outside the cell, as in the female of the typical form; hindwing without anal spot and with small ocelli; the female is more strongly marked, partly dusted over with black, the forewing with broader submarginalband, on the hindwing the submarginal lunulus and the anal spot strongly developed.
 P. c. claudianus Stichel, 1907 British Columbia, Vancouver Island - Larger on the average, with much broadened marginal pattern on the forewing. Marginal and submarginal bands are merged into a broad stripe, through the middle of which runs only one row of small white crescents. In the female the black band-pattern is less intensive but broader, the connection of the costal spot and hindmarginal spot only shadowed as a narrow streak, on the hindwing very large marginal lunules, the anal spot without red dot. There are transitions to the typical form. 
 P. c. incredibilis Bryk, 1932 Mount St. Elias, Alaska
 P. c. menetriesii H. Edwards, 1877 Wahsatch Mountains, Utah - The two ocelli only remain as vestiges.
 P. c. pseudogallatinus Bryk, 1913 British Columbia Cascades of north Washington
 P. c. sol Bryk & Eisner, 1932 California (Tulare to Modoc and S Siskiyou) Mount St. Elias - Usually at less than 
 P. c. strohbeeni Sternitzky, 1945 Santa Cruz Mountains, California  - Apparently extinct

References

Further reading
sv:Parnassius clodius Swedish Wikipedia provides further references and synonymy

External links
Butterflies of America Extensive photo gallery including types
P. clodius images  at  Consortium for the Barcode of Life
 Montana University Butterflies and Moths of North America.
 Pteron In Japanese but binomial names. Images.
IMNH

clodius
Butterflies of North America
Butterflies described in 1855
Taxa named by Édouard Ménétries